The Indian day gecko or Nilgiri dwarf gecko (Cnemaspis indica) is a species of diurnal and insectivorous, rock-dwelling gecko found in the high elevation (> 1800 m asl) grasslands and montane forests of the Western Ghats ranges in South India, such as the Nilgiri Hills (including Ooty and Mukurthi National Park) and the Silent Valley National Park) in Tamil Nadu and Kerala states, respectively.

References

 Boulenger, G.A. 1885 Catalogue of the Lizards in the British Museum (Nat. Hist.) I. Geckonidae, Eublepharidae, Uroplatidae, Pygopodidae, Agamidae. London: 450 pp.
 Gray, J. E. 1846 Descriptions of some new species of Indian Lizards. Ann. Mag. Nat. Hist. (1)18: 429-430
  Bhupathy S, Nixon, A.M.A.2002 Communal egg laying by Cnemaspis indica in Mukuruthi National Park, Western Ghats, India. J Bombay Nat Hist Soc,99(2), 332.

Cnemaspis
Reptiles described in 1846
Taxa named by John Edward Gray